Lake Belvedere Estates is a census-designated place (CDP) in Palm Beach County, Florida, United States. The population was 2,091 at the 2020 census.

Geography
Lake Belvedere Estates is located at  (26.689143, -80.134282).

According to the United States Census Bureau, the CDP has a total area of 1.5 km2 (0.6 mi2), all land.

Demographics

As of the census of 2000, there were 1,525 people, 478 households, and 409 families residing in the CDP.  The population density was 1,015.2/km2 (2,634.9/mi2).  There were 497 housing units at an average density of 330.8/km2 (858.7/mi2).  The racial makeup of the CDP was 65.70% White (55.9% were Non-Hispanic White,) 26.10% African American, 0.20% Native American, 1.31% Asian, 3.74% from other races, and 2.95% from two or more races. Hispanic or Latino of any race were 14.43% of the population.

There were 478 households, out of which 42.5% had children under the age of 18 living with them, 64.0% were married couples living together, 15.3% had a female householder with no husband present, and 14.4% were non-families. 10.3% of all households were made up of individuals, and 2.3% had someone living alone who was 65 years of age or older.  The average household size was 3.19 and the average family size was 3.39.

In the CDP, the population was spread out, with 29.4% under the age of 18, 8.3% from 18 to 24, 31.1% from 25 to 44, 24.9% from 45 to 64, and 6.4% who were 65 years of age or older.  The median age was 35 years. For every 100 females, there were 102.0 males.  For every 100 females age 18 and over, there were 94.1 males.

The median income for a household in the CDP was $45,774, and the median income for a family was $45,577. Males had a median income of $30,530 versus $27,891 for females. The per capita income for the CDP was $16,784.  About 12.3% of families and 17.9% of the population were below the poverty line, including 32.3% of those under age 18 and 5.6% of those age 65 or over.

As  of 2000, English was the first language for 79.89% of all residents, while Spanish made up 15.90%, and French Creole was the mother tongue for 4.20% of the population.

References

Census-designated places in Palm Beach County, Florida
Census-designated places in Florida